Ximera is a massive open online course by Ohio State University on Coursera and YouTube.  The system was originally known as MOOCulus and Calculus One.

The course features over 25 hours of video and exercises. The instructor is Jim Fowler, an associate professor of mathematics at the Ohio State University. The course was available for the first time on Coursera during the Spring Semester of 2012–13. More than 47,000 students enrolled in the course, and several thousand successfully completed the 15-week course, which has been favorably reviewed.

Course Overview 
The course begins with an introduction to functions and limits, and goes on to explain derivatives. By the end of this course, the student will have learnt the fundamental theorem of calculus, chain rule, derivatives of transcendental functions, integration, and applications of all these in the real world. This course is followed by Calculus Two.

Development 
Ximera course was initially released on Coursera in the Spring Semester of 2012–13 under the name Calculus One. MOOCulus, an online platform that lets you practice Calculus was developed at the Ohio State University to provide students a place to practice Calculus problems. The platform, which was built using Ruby on Rails was built because Coursera didn't offer an engaging way to practice problems. The whole course, which consists of 200+ videos, was typeset as a textbook on April 10, 2014. The textbook, which is licensed under Creative Commons Attribution Non-commercial Share Alike License, incorporated some of its example and exercise problems from Elementary calculus: An approach using Infinitesimals.

References

External links 
 Ximera Official Website

Mathematics education
Calculus
American educational websites
Ohio State University
2012 establishments in Ohio